Tell Afis is an archaeological site in the Idlib region of northern Syria, and lies about fifty kilometres southeast of Aleppo. 
The site is thought to be that of ancient Hazrek (or Hazrach; Hatarikka for the Assyrians) capital of Luhuti.

History
Occupation of the site is stretching from the fourth millennium BCE to the Neo-Assyrian period.

Late Bronze
Around 1350 BC, the Hittite ruler Suppiluliuma I gain control over the northern parts of Syria. This region was then called Nuhasse.

Levels VII to V have been firmly dated to the time of control by 13th century BC Hittite ruler Hattusili III by seals, pottery, and several tablets.

Iron Age
In the Iron Age, Tell Afis was in the Kingdom of Hamath. The Stele of Zakkur, dated c, 785 BC, which contains a dedication in Aramaic to the gods Iluwer and Baalshamin, was discovered here in 1903. Three additional Aramaic fragments were later found.

Archaeology
The tell is 28 hectares in area (570 meters by 500 meters) with an extensive lower city and an acropolis on the northern edge. In 1932 William F. Albright collected Iron Age pottery in a surface collection. In 1970, 1972, and 1978 excavations were conducted by Paolo Matthiae. The site was excavated from 1986 until 2010 by a joint project from the universities of Rome, Pisa and Bologna, under the direction of Stefania Mazzoni and Serena Maria Cecchini. A sizable Iron Age cultic area was discovered on the acropolis.

The site was reportedly damaged by encampments during the Syrian civil war.

See also
Cities of the ancient Near East

References

Iron Age sites in Syria
Archaeological sites in Idlib Governorate